Andreas Schnieders (22 December 1966 – 6 October 2022) was a German boxer.

He competed in the men's super heavyweight event at the 1988 Summer Olympics.

References

External links
 

1966 births
2022 deaths
Super-heavyweight boxers
German male boxers
Olympic boxers of West Germany
Boxers at the 1988 Summer Olympics
People from Cloppenburg (district)
Sportspeople from Lower Saxony